Kervinen is a Finnish surname. Notable people with the surname include:

 Olli Kervinen (1924–1997), Finnish farmer and politician
 Esa Kervinen (1929–2016), Finnish sport shooter
 Jani Kervinen (born 1983), Finnish electronic music producer

Finnish-language surnames